The Bryant School in Winfield, Kansas was listed on the National Register of Historic Places on October 4, 2017. It was built and expanded in c.1880, 1916, and 1938. It has also been known as West Ward School, as Second Ward School, as Western Public School, and as the Cowley County Historical Society Museum.

It served as a school until 1964.  It became home of the Cowley County Historical Society Museum in the late 1960s and is used as a museum still in 2017.

References

School buildings on the National Register of Historic Places in Kansas
Schools in Kansas
School buildings completed in 1880
Cowley County, Kansas